McKenna or Makenna may refer to:

 McKenna (name), including a list of people with the name
 McKenna, Washington, an unincorporated town in the United States
 McKenna (TV series), a 1994–1995 ABC series starring Chad Everett and Jennifer Love Hewitt
 Dr. McKenna Cup, Gaelic football competition

See also
 MacKenna (disambiguation)
 Kenna (disambiguation)
 Makena (disambiguation)
 Justice McKenna (disambiguation)